Thomas Lundon (21 June 1883 – 28 October 1951) was an Irish nationalist politician and Member of Parliament (MP) in the House of Commons of the United Kingdom of Great Britain and Ireland.

He was first elected as the Irish Parliamentary Party MP for the East Limerick constituency at the 1909 East Limerick by-election following the death of the sitting MP, his father William Lundon. He was re-elected at the January 1910 and December 1910 general elections, but lost his seat at the 1918 general election. His grand nephew is Tony Lundon.

External links

References

1883 births
1951 deaths
Irish Parliamentary Party MPs
Members of the Parliament of the United Kingdom for County Limerick constituencies (1801–1922)
UK MPs 1906–1910
UK MPs 1910
UK MPs 1910–1918